Mikołaj Marek Dowgielewicz (born 23 October 1972 in Gorzów Wielkopolski) was Polish Minister for European Affairs in 2007–2012. Currently working at European Investment Bank as the Director General and Permanent Representative.

References

Living people
1972 births
Government ministers of Poland
University of Warsaw alumni